Nina Gladys Sevening (1885 – 1958) was an English stage actress and singer who played minor comedy roles in a long string of Edwardian musical comedies in London and on tour.

Background
Sevening was born in Westminster, London.  Her parents were H. W. Sevening, a German-born commercial clerk, and his English wife Gertrude. She was educated in London and Paris.

Career
Sevening first appeared on stage in December 1894 in The House That Jack Built at the Opera Comique. She later appeared in:
My Innocent Boy at the Royalty Theatre 1898
 Florodora at the Lyric Theatre 1899
 The Silver Slipper at the Lyric Theatre 1901
 A Country Girl at Daly's Theatre 1902
 The Cingalee at Daly's Theatre 1904
 The Little Michus at Daly's Theatre 1905
 The Merveilleuses at Daly's Theatre 1906
 The Geisha at Daly's Theatre 1906
 The Merry Widow at Daly's Theatre 1907
 Susannah and Some Others at the Royalty Theatre 1908
 Marjory Strode at The Playhouse 1908
 Mid-Channel at St James's Theatre 1909
 The Great Mrs. Alloway at the Globe Theatre 1909
 Mid-Channel at the Empire Theatre (New York) 1910
 A Woman's Way, Comedy Theatre 1910
 Grace at the Duke of York's Theatre 1910
 Passers By at Wyndham's Theatre 1911
 What Every Woman Knows at the Duke of York's Theatre 1911
 Mind the Paint Girl at the Duke of York's Theatre 1912
 The Perplexed Husband at the Empire Theatre (New York) 1912
 Peter Pan at the Duke of York Theatre 1913
 King's Cup at the Adelphi Theater 1913
 The Clever Ones at Wyndham's Theatre 1914
 Caroline at the New Theatre 1916 
 Trelawny of the 'Wells' at the New Theatre 1917

In 1903, Sevening toured in Three Little Maids.  In 1905 she was a replacement player in the role of Gwenny Holden in Lady Madcap.

She married Victor Charles Hamilton Longstaffe (born 1885) and changed her last name after him. She retired from the stage in 1917.

There is a memorial to their only son, David John Longstaffe, in Aldeburgh Parish Church in Suffolk, England. David died on 16 September 1945 in Athens, where he was a Captain in the King's Royal Rifle Corps.

References

Bibliography

1885 births
1958 deaths
English stage actresses